Overseas Tankship (UK) Ltd v The Miller Steamship Co or Wagon Mound (No. 2), is a landmark tort case, concerning the test for breach of duty of care in negligence. The Judicial Committee of the Privy Council held that loss will be recoverable where the extent of possible harm is so great that a reasonable man would guard against it (even if the chance of the loss occurring was very small).

Wagon Mound (No. 2) should not be confused with the previous case of the Overseas Tankship (UK) Ltd v Morts Dock and Engineering Co Ltd or Wagon Mound (No. 1), which introduced remoteness as a rule of causation to limit compensatory damages.

Facts

Overseas Tankship chartered a freighter ship named the Wagon Mound which was taking on bunker oil at Mort's Dock in Sydney.  The engineers on the Wagon Mound were careless and a large quantity of oil overflowed onto the surface of the water.  After several hours the oil drifted and was around two ships owned by the Miller Steamship Co that were being repaired nearby. Sparks from the welders caused the leaked oil to ignite destroying all three ships.

Walsh J held that Overseas Tankship were not liable for negligence, but that the large quantity of oil was a public nuisance and the Overseas Tankship were liable to pay damages for nuisance.

Overseas Tankship obtained leave to appeal directly to the Privy Council on the verdict of nuisance and the Miller Steamship Co obtained leave to appeal on the verdict of negligence.

Judgment

The Privy Council upheld both the appeal and the cross-appeal. They held that it was not sufficient that the  damage to the Miller Steamship vessels was the direct result of the nuisance if that damage was unforeseeable. In relation to negligence the Privy Council held that a reasonable person in the position of the ship's engineer would have been aware of the risk of fire. Since the gravity of the potential damage from fire was so great there was no excuse for allowing the oil to be discharged even if the probability or risk of fire was low. A reasonable person, the Council held, would only neglect a risk of such a potentially great magnitude if he or she had a reason to do so, e.g. if it were cost prohibitive. Lord Reid said at 718–719,

The words "real risk" are the requirement of remoteness of damage but the test of foreseeability does not depend upon the actual risk of occurrence. The test is  really whether the engineer ought to have foreseen the outbreak of fire, i.e. the type of consequence ought to have been foreseen.

Significance

This idea of a balance between magnitude and seriousness of risk is similar to that proposed by Learned Hand in United States v. Carroll Towing Co. 159 F.2d 169 (2d Cir. 1947) on the subject of legal causation. Such a formulation of the issue has struck some in the field as an argument along the lines typically made in the Law & Economics camp usually seen to be represented by the American Judge Richard Posner.

The holding in this case was harshly criticized for its "overloading of the foreseeability concept" by renowned torts scholar Leon A. Green.

See also

 Re Polemis, [1921] 3 K.B. 560
 List of Judicial Committee of the Privy Council cases

References

Judicial Committee of the Privy Council cases on appeal from Australia
English tort case law
1966 in Australian law
1966 in case law